His Majestys Sagbutts & Cornetts (HMSC) is a British early music group founded in 1982. The ensemble presently consists of three cornetts and four sackbuts, with chamber organ or harpsichord. The group frequently collaborates with other instrumentalists and singers, and has an extensive discography on Hyperion Records and other labels.

History
HMSC's first concert was on 3 September 1982 at the church of St Martin-in-the-Fields, Trafalgar Square, London, with guest soloist Richard Wistreich. Meridian Records expressed their interest in recording the group as early as the interval of that first concert.

Members
The original line-up was cornettists Jeremy West, David Staff and sackbut players Sue Addison, Richard Cheetham, Paul Nieman and Stephen Saunders. Each member attended the Guildhall School of Music and Drama, with the exception of Addison. Later non-current members include Peter Bassano (sackbuts).

Current ensemble
Jeremy West, founder member and cornett (1982–);

Stephen Saunders, founder member and bass sackbut (1982–);

Susan Addison, founder member and Alto and Tenor Sackbut

Jamie Savan, cornett (2005–);

Helen Roberts, cornett (2012–);

Stephanie Dyer, alto & tenor sackbuts (2016–).

Founder members (est. 1982)

Cornetts 
Jeremy West, David Staff

Sackbuts 
Sue Addison, Richard Cheetham, Paul Nieman, Stephen Saunders

Keyboard 
Alistair Ross

Selected discography 
His Majesties Sagbutts and Cornetts - by His Majesties Sagbutts and Cornetts Meridian
Giovanni Battista Grillo - complete instrumental music & selected motets by His Majestys Sagbutts & Cornetts
The Twelve Days of Christmas by His Majestys Sagbutts & Cornetts
Buccaneer - Music from England and Spain by His Majestys Sagbutts & Cornetts
Grand Tour - Music From 16th And 17th Century Italy, Spain And Germany by His Majestys Sagbutts & Cornetts Hyperion
Giovanni Gabrieli: The 16 Canzonas and Sonatas from Sacrae Symphoniae, 1597 His Majestys Sagbutts and Cornetts, Timothy Roberts  
Andrea Gabrieli: Missa Pater peccavi; Motets and Instrumental Music Timothy Roberts
Giovanni Gabrieli: Canzoni Per Sonare, Venice, 1608 by His Majestys Sagbutts & Cornetts
1615 Gabrieli in Venice by Choir of King's College, Cambridge, Stephen Cleobury
A Bach Album by His Majestys Consort of Voices and His Majestys Sagbutts & Cornetts
Guerrero: Missa de la batalla escoutez by Westminster Cathedral Choir  and His Majestys Sagbutts & Cornetts
For These Distracted Tymes - Music from the Civil Wars His Majestys Sagbutts and Cornetts, London Baroque Meridian
Music from 17th Century Germany Richard Wistreich His Majestys Sagbutts and Cornetts, Meridian
Venice Preserved - Gentlemen of the Chappell, His Majesties Sagbutts and Cornetts, Peter Bassano ASV Gaudeamus
Castello and Picchi: The Floating City - Sonatas, canzonas and dances by two of Monteverdi’s contemporaries His Majestys Sagbutts & Cornetts Hyperion
For His Majestys Sagbutts and Cornetts - English music from Henry VIII to Charles II  His Majestys Sagbutts & Cornetts Hyperion Records
Lassus: Missa Vinum Bonum  Ex Cathedra & His Majesty's Sagbutts & Cornetts, Jeffrey Skidmore ASV
Giovanni Gabrieli  Ex Cathedra & His Majesty's Sagbutts & Cornetts, Jeffrey Skidmore Hyperion
Monteverdi: Vespro della beata Vergine (1610) Monteverdi Choir, English Baroque Soloists, His Majesties Sagbutts and Cornetts, John Eliot Gardiner Archiv
Monteverdi L'Orfeo Monteverdi Choir, English Baroque Soloists, His Majesties Sagbutts and Cornetts,  John Eliot Gardiner Archiv
Schutz Musikalische Exequien Monteverdi Choir, English Baroque Soloists, His Majesties Sagbutts and Cornetts,  John Eliot Gardiner Archiv
Philippe Rogier: Music from the Missae Sex His Majestys Sagbutts and Cornetts & Magnificat, Philip Cave  Linn Records
Philippe Rogier: Polychoral Works His Majestys Sagbutts and Cornetts & Magnificat, Philip Cave 
Guerrero - Missa Super flumina Babylonis Ensemble Plus Ultra, Schola Antiqua & His Majestys Sagbutts and Cornetts, Michael Noone Glossa
Gioseffo Guami 'La Luchesina' His Majesty's Sagbutts & Cornetts  SFZ Music
Capriccio Stravagante, Vol.1 by The Purcell Quartet Chandos
Capriccio Stravagante, Vol.2 by The Purcell Quartet Chandos
Laudent Deum: Sacred Music by Orlande de Lassus by Andrew Nethsingha Chandos
Lassus: Missa Bell' Amfitrit' altera by Westminster Cathedral Choir and His Majestys Sagbutts & Cornetts Hyperion

References

External links
 Homepage

British early music ensembles